King Huiwen of Zhao (born 310 BCE - died 266 BCE, reigned 298 BCE – 266 BCE) reigned in the State of Zhao during the Warring States period of Chinese history. During his reign, the Zhao state reached its apogee, with famous administrators and generals alike such as Lin Xiangru, Lian Po, Zhao She and Li Mu. He was the first ruler of Zhao to style himself "king" without later reversing the decision, and also the last ruler during the Warring States period to declare himself king.

Zhao He was originally one of the younger sons of King Wuling; however, since King Wuling favoured Zhao He's mother Wu Wa, he eventually made Zhao He heir, while the eldest son Zhao Zhang was demoted to Lord Anyang. In 298 BCE, Zhao Wuling abdicated his throne and Zhao He became king of Zhao.

In 295 BCE, Lord Anyang revolted at Shaqiu. Government forces prevailed, however, and Lord Anyang fled to Zhao Wuling's palace for safety. Generals Li Dui and Gongzi Cheng thus began besieging the palace. In due time, Lord Anyang was handed over and killed; however, the generals did not let up the siege and King Wuling eventually died of hunger.

King Zhao Huiwen is a central character in many of the stories told about Lin Xiangru. In 283 BCE, King Zhaoxiang of Qin extended an offer (which he had no intention of abiding by) to Zhao that would see Qin hand over fifteen cities in exchange for the sacred jade Heshibi. Lin Xiangru's actions saved face for Zhao and humiliated the Qin.

In 279 BCE, King Zhaoxiang of Qin invited King Huiwen to a meeting at Shengci; once there, he again attempted to shame King Huiwen by ordering the latter to play the zither. Lin Xiangru's actions again caused the Qin to lose face and earned him great acclaim throughout China.

In 270 BCE, Qin invaded Han and threatened crucial Zhao interests in central China, especially with regards to the Shangdang region (present-day southern Shanxi). King Huiwen sent forces to intervene; under the leadership of Zhao She the Qin forces were defeated. This minor skirmish enhanced Zhao prestige, but was to foreshadow a greater Zhao-Qin rivalry that would end disastrously for the former at the Battle of Changping a decade later.

King Huiwen of Zhao died in 266 BCE and was succeeded by his son and heir, King Xiaocheng.

Notes and references

 Zhao Guo Shi Gao (Draft History of the Zhao State), Shen Changyun, Zhonghua Book Company, China.
Records of the Grand Historian, volume 15, volume 43

310 BC births
266 BC deaths
Monarchs of Zhao (state)
Chinese kings
3rd-century BC Chinese monarchs
Zhao (state)
Zhou dynasty nobility